is a city located in Gifu, Japan. , the city had an estimated population of 89,020 and a population density of 190 persons per km2 in 35,366 households.

Geography
Seki is located in central Gifu Prefecture at the northern tip of the Nōbi Plain, approximately 40 kilometers north of Nagoya. Due to various municipal mergers, the city has a "U" shape, almost enclosing the city of Mino. Also as a result of the merger, the population center of population in Japan now is located in Sekiuchi (former Mutsumi-cho area). The Nagara River and Itadori River flow through the city.

Climate
The city has a climate characterized by hot and humid summers, and mild winters (Köppen climate classification Cfa).  The average annual temperature in Seki is 15.2 °C. The average annual rainfall is 2090 mm with September as the wettest month. The temperatures are highest on average in August, at around 27.8 °C, and lowest in January, at around 3.4 °C.

Neighbouring municipalities
Gifu Prefecture
Gifu
Mino
Minokamo
Motosu
Kakamigahara
Gujo
Yamagata
Tomika
 Sakahogi
 Hichisō
Gero
Fukui Prefecture
Ōno

Demographics
Per Japanese census data, the population of Seki peaked around the year 2000 and has declined since.

History
The area around Seki was part of traditional Mino Province.  In the post-Meiji restoration cadastral reforms, Mugi District in Gifu prefecture was created, and the town of Seki was established on July 1, 1889, with the establishment of the modern municipalities system. Seki was elevated to city status on October 15, 1950. On February 7, 2005, the towns of Mugegawa and Mugi, and the villages of Horado, Itadori and Kaminoho (all from Mugi District) were merged into Seki.).

Government
Seki has a mayor-council form of government with a directly elected mayor and a unicameral city legislature of 23 members.

Economy
Seki is today considered the home of modern Japanese kitchen cutlery, where state-of-the-art manufacturing and technology has updated ancient forging skills to produce a world-class series of stainless and laminated steel kitchen knives famed throughout the world. The major cutlery making companies are based in Seki, and they produce the highest quality kitchen knives in the traditional Japanese style and the western style, like the gyuto and the santoku. Knives and swords are so much a part of the city that it is home of the Seki Cutlery Association, the Seki Swordsmith Museum, the Seki Outdoor Knife Show, the October Cutlery Festival, and the Cutlery Hall where tourists can purchase knives.

Education

Universities and colleges
Chubu Gakuin University
Chubu Gakuin College
Gifu University of Medical Science

Primary and secondary education
Seki has 19 public elementary schools and nine public middle schools operated by the city government. The city has two public high schools operated by the Gifu Prefectural Board of Education, and one by the city government.

Transportation

Railway
 Nagaragawa Railway Etsumi-Nan Line 
   -  -  -  -  -

Highway
 Tōkai-Hokuriku Expressway
 Tōkai-Kanjō Expressway

Sister city relations
 - Huangshi, Hubei, China, friendship city since 1997
 - Mogi das Cruzes, São Paulo, Brazil, since 1999

Local attractions
Nemichi Shire is a Shinto shrine located in Seki.

Notable people from Seki
Kinju (金重) - a famous swordsmith. He is also known as Kaneshige using the Japanese pronunciation of his name. He and Kaneuji are founders of the Mino style. Considered to be one of the Juttetsu or "Ten Famous Students" or "10 Great Disciples of Masamune".  Moving to Mino Province (today part of Gifu Prefecture) around the time of Ryakuo (1338–1342) creating the Seki tradition.
Enkū (円空) (1632–1695) was a Buddhist monk, poet and sculptor  during the early Edo period. He was born in Mino, traveled extensively and died in Seki and is celebrated at the Enkū Museum.

References

External links

 Seki City official website 

 
Cities in Gifu Prefecture